Legend: The Best of Willie Nelson is a compilation album by country singer Willie Nelson, released on May 5, 2008.

Track listing 
"On the Road Again"
"To All the Girls I've Loved Before" (w/ Julio Iglesias)
"Crazy"
"City of New Orleans"
"Blue Eyes Crying in the Rain"
"Always on My Mind"
"Me and Paul"
"Good Hearted Woman" (w/ Waylon Jennings)
"Night Life"
"Georgia on My Mind"
"My Heroes Have Always Been Cowboys"
"Pancho and Lefty" (w/ Merle Haggard)
"Funny How Time Slips Away"
"Hello Walls"
"Highwayman" (w/ Johnny Cash ; Kris Kristoferson ; Waylon Jennings)
"Blue Skies"
"Mammas Don't Let Your Babies Grow Up to Be Cowboys" (w/ Waylon Jennings)
"Whiskey River" (Live, April 1978)
"Seven Spanish Angels" (w/ Ray Charles)
"Bloody Mary Morning"

Personnel 
Willie Nelson - Guitar, Vocals

Chart performance
The album debuted on the UK album chart at No. 16 with 7,829 copies sold for the week.

Certifications

References

2000 compilation albums
Willie Nelson compilation albums